The Aalbach is a 26.5 km long river in Bavaria and Baden-Württemberg, Germany. It is a left and eastern tributary of the Main near Wertheim am Main.

See also
List of rivers of Baden-Württemberg

References

Rivers of Baden-Württemberg
Rivers of Bavaria
Rivers of Germany